Collen Mashawana (born 2 September 1981) is a South African philanthropist and entrepreneur.

Early life
Collen Mashawana was born in Venda, Limpopo. He attended his junior school at Tshishonga Primary School and completed High School at Liivha Private School. He proceeded to study Information Technology and Business Management at Henley Business School.

Career background
Mashawana's career began at Microsoft South Africa after completing his studies in Information Technology. He then joined Dimension Data in 2005 where during that period he received the Esprit du Corp Award in 2008. In the same year, he was appointed as National Public Sector Director for South Africa.

Mashawana formed Afribiz Invest in 2005 and the investment company is reported to be having about 25 subsidiaries through acquisitions and mergers. In 2010 he established another IT company Khwinisa Technologies now Telcolink. In 2018 he was honored by the South African Government, Department of Social Development with an Award of Entrepreneur of the Year through the South African Men of the Year. Collen Mashawana has further been nominated as one of the 100 most influential Africans for 2020 by the Reputation Poll International.

Philanthropy
Mashawana established the Collen Mashawana Foundation in 2012 and foundation's thrust is to assist the most disadvantaged members of communities by bringing relief to the elderly, people living with a disability, and child-headed families with economic empowerment and housing programs and initiatives as well as other community organisations. The foundation has built around 300 houses and some of its initiatives are in collaboration with the South African government.

References

South African businesspeople
South African philanthropists
1981 births
Living people